Zakaria Messoudi (born October 30, 1993) is a professional soccer player who plays as a midfielder. Born in Morocco, he represented Canada at youth international level.

Career

Early career
Born in Casablanca, Morocco, Messoudi moved to Canada at the age of eight. He played his youth soccer with Montreal-Concordia AAA before joining the Montreal Impact Academy in 2010 to play in the Canadian Soccer League.

Montreal Impact
On June 4, 2013 it was announced that Messoudi had signed his first professional contract with the Montreal Impact of Major League Soccer.

On March 28, 2014 it was confirmed that Messoudi would join new expansion North American Soccer League side Ottawa Fury FC for the 2014 season. He then made his professional debut in the Canadian Championship against FC Edmonton. He came on as a 77th-minute substitute for Oliver Minatel as the match ended 0–0. Messoudi would fail to make a league appearance for Ottawa and upon his return to Montreal, his contract option was declined at the end of the 2014 season.

FC Montreal
Despite being cut Messoudi would remain a part of the Impact organization, being announced as part of the roster of the newly formed FC Montreal on March 13, 2015. He was released by the team at the end of the 2015 USL season.

Odds Ballklubb
Messoudi signed a 2-year deal with Norwegian top-flight Odd on March 17, 2016. He shortly after made his debut coming on as a substitute in a cup tie against Tollnes BK. Messoudi left the club after the 2017 season, where his contract expired.

International
Messoudi made his international debut for the Canada U20 side on February 18, 2013 against Cuba U20 in the 2013 CONCACAF U-20 Championship.

Career statistics

References

1993 births
Living people
Footballers from Casablanca
Canadian soccer players
Canada men's youth international soccer players
Moroccan footballers
Moroccan emigrants to Canada
CF Montréal players
Ottawa Fury FC players
FC Montreal players
Association football midfielders
USL Championship players
Canadian expatriate soccer players
Montreal Impact U23 players
Canadian Soccer League (1998–present) players
Expatriate footballers in Norway
Canadian expatriate sportspeople in Norway
Homegrown Players (MLS)
Première ligue de soccer du Québec players
CS Mont-Royal Outremont players